The bazas, Aviceda, are a genus of bird of prey in the family Accipitridae. The genus has a widespread distribution from Australia to southern Asia and across to Africa. The bazas are sometimes known as cuckoo-hawks.
A prominent crest is a feature of the bazas. They have two tooth-like indentations on the edge of the upper bill.

Etymology 
Aviceda:  ″bird″; -cida ″killer″, from caedere ″to kill″

Species

Notes

References 

 
Bird genera
Taxonomy articles created by Polbot